Kathleen Kim is an American operatic coloratura soprano. Her repertoire includes roles in operas by Handel, Mozart, Donizetti, Verdi and Offenbach, among others, as well as in oratorios such as the Messiah and sacred works such as Mozart's Great Mass in C minor.

Education
Kim was raised in Seoul, South Korea, where she sang in the children's chorus of the national broadcasting company. "I was on TV every Sunday, singing, and I loved it." She studied classical voice with Fa Park. In 1994, Kim left for the United States during her second year at Seoul Arts High School and enrolled at the Manhattan School of Music, receiving a  Bachelor of Music degree in 1998 and a Master's in 2000.

Kim is also a graduate of the Ryan Opera Center of the Lyric Opera of Chicago. During her training, she appeared in various operatic roles, including Adele in Die Fledermaus, the First Priestess in Iphigénie en Tauride, the page in Rigoletto, the milliner in Der Rosenkavalier and Frasquita in Carmen. Kim attended the Music Academy of the West in 2004.

Career
Kim made her début at the Metropolitan Opera in New York in 2007 as Barbarina in Mozart's The Marriage of Figaro and since then sang at the Met in the roles of Olympia in Les contes d'Hoffmann, Zerbinetta in Ariadne auf Naxos, Oscar in Un ballo in maschera, and Blonde in Die Entführung aus dem Serail. She sang the role of Chiang Ch'ing in the Met's première of John Adams's Nixon in China in 2011 and the roles of Barbara and Mrs. Latch in the Met's world stage premiere of Kevin Puts's The Hours in 2022.

Since her professional début, Kim has sung with major opera companies in numerous theatres across the world, including the Lyric Opera of Chicago, the Gran Teatre del Liceu, the Bayerische Staatsoper and the Opéra de Lille.

Kim is an active presence on the concert stage, having been a soloist with the Seoul Philharmonic Orchestra in works such as Mahler's Eighth Symphony and Beethoven's Ninth Symphony.

Kim made several role débuts in 2011, including her first performance in the title role of Donizetti's Lucia di Lammermoor. In 2012, Kim sang in a performance of Adams's Nixon in China at the BBC Proms, and also sang Mozart's Mass in C minor with the Oslo Philharmonic. In September 2015, she was appointed as a professor of Music College at Hanyang University.

Awards
Kim has been the recipient of many prizes and awards, including an award from the Sullivan Foundation in 2006, the Sarasota Opera Guild's Leo Rogers Scholarship and the Union League Civic & Arts Foundation's Rose Ann Grund Scholarship. She was the third-prize winner of the Mario Lanza Competition, a prize winner of the Liederkranz Competition, and a national finalist in the MacAllister Awards. At Music Academy of the West, she received the Encouragement Award of the Marilyn Horne Foundation Song Competition.

Repertoire
Kathleen Kim's repertoire includes the following operatic roles:

Armida in Handel's Rinaldo at the Central City Opera House
Blonde in Mozart's Die Entführung aus dem Serail at the Metropolitan Opera
Chiang Ch'ing in John Adams's Nixon in China at the Metropolitan Opera and the Chicago Opera Theater
La Fée in Massenet's Cendrillon at Opéra de Lille and the Metropolitan Opera
Le Feu, la Princesse and le Rossignol in Ravel's L'enfant et les sortilèges at the Glyndebourne Festival Opera and the Teatro dell'Opera di Roma
Königin der Nacht in Mozart's Die Zauberflöte
Blonde in Mozart's Die Entführung aus dem Serail at Minnesota Opera
Lucia in Donizetti's Lucia di Lammermoor at Sarasota Opera
Marie in Donizetti's La fille du régiment at the Asociación Bilbaína de Amigos de la Ópera in Bilbao
Melissa in Handel's Amadigi di Gaula at the Central City Opera House
Olympia in Offenbach's Les contes d'Hoffmann at the Metropolitan Opera, the Gran Teatre del Liceu and the Bayerische Staatsoper
Oscar in Verdi's Un ballo in maschera at the Metropolitan Opera and the San Diego Opera
Poppea in Handel's Agrippina at the Boston Lyric Opera
Tytania in Britten's A Midsummer Night's Dream at the Metropolitan Opera
Zerbinetta in Strauss's Ariadne auf Naxos at the Metropolitan Opera

References

External links
Official website

Profile at HarrisonParrott
, from Les contes d'Hoffmann

American operatic sopranos
Living people
21st-century American women opera singers
American musicians of Korean descent
Manhattan School of Music alumni
Year of birth missing (living people)
Music Academy of the West alumni